Lennart Leander Byman (14 November 1875 in Helsinki – 3 March 1947) was a Finnish Lutheran clergyman and politician. He was a member of the Parliament of Finland from May to September 1922, representing the Swedish People's Party of Finland (SFP).

References

1875 births
1947 deaths
Politicians from Helsinki
People from Uusimaa Province (Grand Duchy of Finland)
20th-century Finnish Lutheran clergy
Swedish People's Party of Finland politicians
Members of the Parliament of Finland (1919–22)
University of Helsinki alumni